Sindh Madressatul Islam University, also known as SMI University, is a university in Karachi, Sindh, Pakistan. Founded in 1885, it is one of the oldest educational institutions in South Asia.

History 
Sindh Madrasa was founded on 1 September 1885 by Hassan Ali Effendi, a Sindhi who settled in Karachi. The originally "kafila serai" grounds of pre-colonial Karachi that were located to the east of Mithadar  eventually incorporated into the school grounds

Its establishment was supported by Indian Muslim jurists including Syed Ahmad Khan and Syed Ameer Ali. It became a popular school for many Muslims of Sindh and Balochistan. Modeled after a British public school, Sindh Madrasa remained a high school until 1943 when it was elevated to a college, and in February 2012 was chartered as a university by the Government of Sindh.

Today, Sindh Madrasa is a publicly funded university located in the Serai Quarter of downtown Karachi, near Habib Bank Plaza building and I. I. Chundrigar Road on an eight-acre estate which is home to several colonial era buildings most of them designed by architect James Strachan. Sindh Madressatul Islam University offers four year undergraduate programs and two year master's degrees, however doesn't award doctorate's. As of 2013, this university has 16 faculty members with PhD degrees teaching there. The university is constructing a 15-floor academic tower in its current campus. The institute has been associated with several prominent South Asian Muslims including Pakistan's founding father and first head of state Mohammad Ali Jinnah who received his matriculation from the school in 1892, apart from Jinnah, Muhammad Hashim Gazdar (9th Mayor of Karachi), Shah Nawaz Bhutto, Abdullah Haroon, Ghulam Hussain Hidayatullah and Muhammad Ayub Khuhro also studied here.

Jinnah's last will
Muhammad Ali Jinnah studied there from 1887 to 1892 and received his basic education there. He loved his alma mater so much that he left one-third of his personal property to it through his last will. Jinnah was delighted to come to the event where the school's status was raised to the level of a college in June 1943.

Academics
 Department of Business Administration
 Department of Accounting and Banking Finance
 Department of Computer Science
 Department of Artificial Intelligence and Mathematical Sciences
 Department of Software Engineering
 Department of Education
 Department OF Environmental Sciences
 Department of Media and Communication Studies
 Department of English
 Department of Social Development

The department offers the following degree programs:
 BBA (Finance, Human Resource Management, Marketing)
 BS (Accounting and Finance, Education, English, Software Engineering, Computer Science, Artificial Intelligence)
 B.Ed (1.5 Years, 2 Years, 4 Years)
 MBA (3.5 years) ((Finance, Human Resource Management, Marketing),
 MBA (2-2.5 years) ((Finance, Human Resource Management, Marketing),
 MBA (1.5 years) ((Finance, Human Resource Management, Marketing),
 MS (Computer Science)
 MS (Education)
 MS (Management Sciences & Public Administration)
 MS (Public Administration)
 Ph.D. in Computer Science (3 Years Program)
 Ph.D. in Media Science    (3 Years Program)
 Ph.D. in Education        (3 Years Program)

The department offers nationally and internationally recognized programs at graduate and undergraduate levels, which have been designed in consultation with the corporate sector. The department is located in Karachi's Business District, close to I.I Chundrigar Road, which is known as the Wall Street of Karachi. Most of the multinational and national trading houses, banks, financial institutions as well as Karachi Chamber of Commerce and Industry are located on walking distance from the department. Living in the 'Business Environment' is one of the advantages that the Business Administration students of SMIU enjoy in addition to opportunities for internships. Being a public-sector institution, SMIU charges minimum fees. It charges about one-sixth of the fee charged by other comparable institutions for business education programs.

The department offers the following programs:
 BS (Computer Science)
 MS (Computer Science)
 Phd (Computer Science)

It is equipped with three computer labs: two of them are computing laboratories while the other one is a hardware laboratory with electronic and digital circuit design courses. The computers are connected through a network.

IT/Industrial Hub:SMIU is located in the area where numbers of IT industries, software houses, institutions, media and government organizations' networks are located, enabling students to seek internships, etc., as well as familiarize themselves with IT related environment.

The department offers the following programs:
 BS Education- 4 years
 Associate Degree in Education – 2 years
 MS Education – 2 years
The department has access to SMIU Model School for practical training of the students of its graduate and undergraduate programs.

The department offers the following programs:
 BS Environmental Sciences
 MS Environmental Sciences
The department offers the following programs:
 BS (Media Studies)
 BS (Social Sciences)
 MS (Media Studies)
 MS (Social Sciences)

The university is located in the area where leading media outlets, both print and electronic, like Daily Dawn, Daily Jang, The News, as well as almost all the major satellite television networks are located. The department has a television studio and FM Radio station, providing an opportunity for hands-on training on broadcasting equipment.

Selected notable alumni
 Muhammad Ali Jinnah
 Abdullah Haroon
 Khan Bahadur Ghulam Nabi Kazi
 Allah Baksh Sarshar Uqaili
 Hassan Ali Effendi
 Ghulam Hussain Hidayatullah
 Allama Ali Khan Abro
 Syed Gulam Mustafa Shah

See also
 List of schools in Karachi
List of universities in Pakistan

References

External links
 official website of Sindh Madressatul Islam

Universities and colleges in Karachi
Educational institutions established in 1885
1885 establishments in India
Religious schools in Pakistan
Islamic universities and colleges